Germa, known in ancient times as Garama, is an archaeological site in Libya. It was the capital of the Garamantian Kingdom.

The Garamantes were a Saharan people living in the Fezzan in the northeastern Sahara Desert. Garamantian power climaxed during the second and the third centuries AD, often in conflict with the Roman Empire to the north. Garama had a population of some four thousand and another six thousand living in villages within a 5 km radius.

The Garamantes often conducted raids across Rome's African frontier, the Limes Tripolitanus, and retreated to the safety of the desert. In 203 the Roman Emperor Septimius Severus launched a campaign deep into the Sahara, capturing Garama, but he abandoned it soon after.

The city was conquered by Uqba ibn Nafi in 669 AD.

Archaeological work at Germa has most recently been conducted by Prof. David Mattingly's Fazzan Project, which has continued the work of Charles Daniels and Mohammed Ayoub. The Fazzan Project has published four volumes based on its work, titled The Archaeology of Fazzān. Digital versions of these books have been made freely available under a policy of open access by the Society for Libian Studies.

See also
Berber
Tuareg
Green Sahara
Toubou

References

External links

Germa - Lexiorient 
Toby Savage, photographer
Nick Brooks' Fezzan Geoarchaeology website
Germa (Roman Garama)

Archaeological sites in Libya
History of Fezzan
Former populated places in Libya
History of the Sahara
~